Brigadier General Mohammad Shahedul Anam Khan is a retired Bangladesh Army officer and defence analyst. He is an associate editor of The Daily Star.

Career 
Khan received his commission in the Pakistan Army in 1968. He studied at the Royal Military College of Science and Staff College, Camberley. 

khan graduated from the National Defence College in 1988.

Anam was the CMO of the United Nations Military Observer Group in Iraq from 1990 to 1991. 30 March 1991 to 6 March 1994, he served as the GOC of the Jalalabad Cantonment.

From 1997 to 2000, Anam was the Director General of the Bangladesh Institute of International and Strategic Studies. He served in Bangladesh Army headquarters as the Director of Military Intelligence and later as the Director of Military Operations.

References 

Living people
Bangladesh Army generals
Year of birth missing (living people)
Bangladeshi writers
Bangladeshi journalists